Grădinile is a commune in Olt County, Oltenia, Romania. It is composed of three villages: Arvăteasca, Grădinile, and Plăviceanca. These were part of Studina Commune until 2004, when they were split off.

The commune is situated on the Wallachian Plain.

Natives
 Ionuț Mitran

References

Communes in Olt County
Localities in Oltenia